Koki Takagi (born 22 December 1936) is a Japanese water polo player. He competed at the 1960 Summer Olympics and the 1964 Summer Olympics.

References

1936 births
Living people
Japanese male water polo players
Olympic water polo players of Japan
Water polo players at the 1960 Summer Olympics
Water polo players at the 1964 Summer Olympics
Sportspeople from Kyoto
Asian Games medalists in water polo
Water polo players at the 1958 Asian Games
Water polo players at the 1962 Asian Games
Asian Games gold medalists for Japan
Medalists at the 1958 Asian Games
Medalists at the 1962 Asian Games